Fremont Peak is a peak in the San Francisco Peaks, a mountain range that takes up a part of the Coconino National Forest in northern Arizona.  It is the third highest point in the state of Arizona. The peak, named in honor John C. Frémont (1813–1890), a civil war general who served as the territorial governor of Arizona from 1878–82. The peak is in the Kachina Peaks Wilderness on the Coconino National Forest.

Fremont offers year round views of the south.  It can be seen from Flagstaff, Arizona as the pointy peak on the right.

See also 
 List of mountains and hills of Arizona by height

References

External links 
 

Volcanoes of Arizona
Mountains of Arizona
Landforms of Coconino County, Arizona
Stratovolcanoes of the United States
Extinct volcanoes
Coconino National Forest
Mountains of Coconino County, Arizona